Astrometeorology (from Greek , astron, "constellation, star"; , metéōros, "high in the sky"; and , -logia) or meteorological astrology is a pseudoscience that attempts to forecast the weather using astrology. It is the belief that the position and motion of celestial objects can be used to predict both seasonal climate and weather. Throughout most of its history astrometeorology was considered a scholarly tradition and was common in academic circles, often in close relation with astronomy, alchemy, meteorology, medicine, and other types of astrology.

Meteorological phenomena correlated to planetary configurations were recorded in Babylonia. Classical astrologers of note such as Claudius Ptolemy constructed a treatise on forecasting weather via astrological means. Astrometeorology is the oldest type of Hellenistic astrology. Johannes Kepler recorded meteorological observations to support his belief that the conjunction of Saturn and the Sun would produce cold weather. In 1686 a large volume written in English was devoted to astrometeorology by John Goad in his book Astro-Meteorologica published in London, England. Astrometeorological societies persisted in Great Britain until the mid-19th century but were not taken seriously by mainstream scientists. Farmers in India during the 21st century have used a form of astrometeorology based on Nakshatra that is not considered a viable practice.

References

See also

 
 
 

Astrology by type
Weather lore
History of astrology